is a Japanese football player. He plays for Kataller Toyama.

Career
Masaki Tozaki joined J3 League club Kataller Toyama in 2017.

References

External links

1994 births
Living people
Tokoha University alumni
Association football people from Shizuoka Prefecture
Japanese footballers
J3 League players
Kataller Toyama players
Association football defenders